P.Ramachandrapuram is a panchayat Village in Virudhunagar district in the Indian state of Tamil Nadu. P.Ramachandrapuram is also called as Pudhuchennelkulam. This village is under the control of  Srivilliputhur Block.

Geography
It is located next to Chatrapatti.

Politics

P.Ramachandrapuram moved to Srivilliputhur (State Assembly Constituency) & Tenkasi (Lok Sabha constituency) after 2009.

Schools
R. Krishnasamy Primary School.

R. Krishnasamy Govt Hr Sec School.

Notable personalities
Freedom fighter R. Krishnasamy Naidu was an Indian politician and former Member of Madras State Legislative Assembly.

Adjacent communities

References

Cities and towns in Virudhunagar district
Villages in Virudhunagar district